Charlotte Gilg-Benedict (1872–1965) was a German botanist noted for studying Capparaceae.  She co-authored several studies with Ernest Friedrich Gilg (cited as Gilg & Benedict), whom she later married.

References

1872 births
1965 deaths
20th-century German women scientists
20th-century German botanists
Women botanists